Helena Valley Southeast is a census-designated place (CDP) in Lewis and Clark County, Montana, United States. The population was 8,227 at the 2010 census. It is part of the Helena Micropolitan Statistical Area.

Geography
Helena Valley Southeast is located in southern Lewis and Clark County at  (46.611392, -111.923425). It is bordered to the southwest by the city of Helena, the state capital, and to the south by the city of East Helena. To the north it is bordered by the Helena Valley Northeast CDP.

Canyon Ferry Road is the main east-west street through the community.

Demographics

As of the census of 2000, there were 7,141 people, 2,495 households, and 1,941 families residing in the CDP. The population density was 441.4 people per square mile (170.4/km2). There were 2,590 housing units at an average density of 160.1/sq mi (61.8/km2). The racial makeup of the CDP was 93.60% White, 0.27% African American, 2.86% Native American, 0.38% Asian, 0.01% Pacific Islander, 0.49% from other races, and 2.39% from two or more races. Hispanic or Latino of any race were 1.93% of the population.

There were 2,495 households, out of which 47.9% had children under the age of 18 living with them, 59.5% were married couples living together, 12.8% had a female householder with no husband present, and 22.2% were non-families. 16.6% of all households were made up of individuals, and 4.1% had someone living alone who was 65 years of age or older. The average household size was 2.86 and the average family size was 3.23.

In the CDP, the population was spread out, with 34.4% under the age of 18, 7.1% from 18 to 24, 33.7% from 25 to 44, 19.5% from 45 to 64, and 5.4% who were 65 years of age or older. The median age was 31 years. For every 100 females, there were 99.6 males. For every 100 females age 18 and over, there were 96.9 males.

The median income for a household in the CDP was $38,147, and the median income for a family was $41,993. Males had a median income of $32,343 versus $21,112 for females. The per capita income for the CDP was $14,349. About 5.6% of families and 7.4% of the population were below the poverty line, including 9.4% of those under age 18 and 5.9% of those age 65 or over.

References

Census-designated places in Lewis and Clark County, Montana
Census-designated places in Montana
Helena, Montana micropolitan area